Chogha or Chagha or Chegha is a Persian word for a tell. It may also refer to:
 Chagha, Isfahan
 Chagha, Lorestan
 Cheqa (disambiguation)
 Choghabur (disambiguation)

See also
Chagha and Chegha and Chogha are common elements in Iranian place names; see: